The Bakhapcha (also "Бохапча") is a river in Magadan Oblast, Russia.

The Bakhapcha is a right tributary of the upper course of the Kolyma.
The nearest village is Sinegorye, located to the west of its mouth. The upper course of the river is a protected area.

Course
The source of the Bakhapcha is in lake Solnechnoye, a small lake located west of the Olsky Plateau (Ольское плато), at the western end of the Kolyma Mountains. The Maymandzhin Range rises to the east of the river basin. The river heads across an uninhabited area roughly northwards until its mouth. Flowing across mountainous terrain there are many rapids. In the floodplain of the middle reaches the riverbed branches into sleeves with many islands in between. Further downstream the river is slightly meandering. Finally the Bakhapcha joins the right bank of the Kolyma  from its mouth,  to the east of Sinegorye.

The river freezes yearly between late October and late May.

See also
List of rivers of Russia

References

External links
Хасынский район - Активный отдых для энергичных людей Tourist routes (in Russian)

Rivers of Magadan Oblast